The Supreme Price is a 2014 Nigerian documentary war film directed by Joanna Lipper and co-produced by director herself with Janis Vogel. The film stars Hafsat Abiola herself where she narrates about the women's rights in Nigeria following the annulment of her father's victory in Nigeria's Presidential Election and her mother's assassination by agents of the military dictatorship.

The film received critics positive acclaim and screened worldwide. The film won Gucci Tribeca Spotlighting Women Documentary Award and the Best Documentary award at the Africa International Film Festival (AFRIFF). The documentary also nominated for the Best Documentary award at the Africa Movie Academy Awards as wellas the Grierson Awards for the Best Historical Documentary.

Cast
 Hafsat Abiola

References

External links 
 

Nigerian documentary films
2014 films
2014 documentary films
Short film compilations
2010s English-language films